The Canadian Guards (officially known as the Regiment of Canadian Guards) was an infantry regiment of the Canadian Army that served in the same role as the five regiments of foot guards in the British Army. The regiment was formed on 16 October 1953, by Lieutenant-General Guy Simonds, the Chief of the General Staff of the Canadian Army, with the redesignation of four separate battalions:

3rd Battalion, The Royal Canadian Regiment – 1st Battalion
3rd Battalion, Princess Patricia's Canadian Light Infantry – 2nd Battalion
1st Canadian Infantry Battalion – 3rd Battalion
2nd Canadian Infantry Battalion – 4th Battalion

On 25 November 1953, the following reserve units affiliated with the Canadian Guards but remained separate regiments (see ):
The Governor General's Foot Guards – 5th Battalion
The Canadian Grenadier Guards – 6th Battalion

The Canadian Guards not only served as the Household Division of Canada, but was also the country's first national military regiment. The regiment was reduced to nil strength and assigned to the supplementary order of battle in 1970.

History
The regiment was created when it was decided that the composite 1st and 2nd Canadian Infantry Battalions that were created for the 27th Canadian Infantry Brigade should not be given a specific territorial identity.  The Guards would be able to recruit nationally, and the chief of staff of the Canadian Army, Lieutenant General Guy Simonds, said there was nothing wrong with infusing the standard of the Household Brigade into the Canadian Army. Despite political divisions in the government over the concept, the plan received support from the Royal House with the Queen writing to Simonds on 19 October 1954 and counselling him to "not allow any criticism of this sort to depress you unduly." Several weeks later, reserve or militia affiliations were added, when the Governor General's Foot Guards and Canadian Grenadier Guards were designated the 5th and 6th Battalions. Despite the battalion numbers, they remained distinct regiments (see ).

The 3rd and 4th Battalions were disbanded in 1957 to make way for the formation of Regular Army armoured regiments, the 8th Canadian Hussars (Princess Louise's) and The Fort Garry Horse, leaving the 1st and 2nd Battalions and the Regimental Depot in the Regular Force. In October 1957, the 1st Battalion received its first stand of colours, while the 2nd Battalion was deployed to Germany as part of 4 CIBG. Two years later, the 1st Battalion replaced the 2nd Battalion, with the 2nd Battalion receiving its colours in 1960. In the late 1960s, as part of a reorganization of the Canadian Army, it was decided to disband The Canadian Guards. The 1st Battalion was disbanded on 1 October 1968, and the 2nd Battalion was reduced to nil strength on 6 July 1970  (its personnel and equipment going to the new 3rd Battalion, The Royal Canadian Regiment). The month before, a final Trooping of the Colour parade in front of Governor General Roland Michener took place on Parliament Hill. The role of Household Troops then reverted to the two surviving militia units, which resumed their separate identities in 1976. Some members were reassigned to The Canadian Airborne Regiment.

Controversy
At the time, the regiment was criticized for being irrelevant and a show unit. Lieutenant Colonel J. Thomas Bowie, an 83-year-old veteran of the foot guards, claimed that the guards "have no history, no tradition, no nothing." At a 1952 convention of the Royal Canadian Legion, the guards were branded as "an affront and disgrace". Julian Ferguson, a Member of the House of Commons for Simcoe North as well as a World War I recipient of the Military Cross, attacked the Guards as having "never fought and never defeated". He then shook his finger at the then Minister of National Defence Brooke Claxton, and exclaimed "Shame on you!". Colonel Strome Galloway, who commanded the Guards' 4th Battalion from 1955 to 1957 and was the first and last regimental lieutenant-colonel, believed that the disbanding of the Guards was a "political decision" by powerful "francophone" elements. "Our crime," Galloway wrote, "was that we were 'too British' in uniform and character to pass muster with the Francophone hierarchy which dominated the Defence Department at the time. The Unification program was the official excuse, but the program itself was partly a gimmick to 'Americanize' the Canadian forces and eliminate, as far as possible, the British traditions of the past."

Characteristics and duties
The regiment was originally raised to be similar to the five regiments of the British Foot Guards: the Grenadier Guards, Coldstream Guards, Scots Guards, Irish Guards and Welsh Guards. The Canadian Guards wore a white-over-red plume on the left side of their bearskins. Ceremonial dress uniform was similar to that worn by The Canadian Grenadier Guards, with the Canadian version of the "Home Service" Dress tunic being worn in the summer and Atholl-grey greatcoats authorized for wear in the autumn and winter. The standard service rifle for the guards was the C1A1 (Self-Loading Rifle). Its cap badge is a star that has ten points to symbolize the ten provinces of Canada. The maple leaves are based the Royal Arms of Canada, with the colour changed from red to gold.

The most prominent role of the 1st Battalion was the performance of public duties in the Ottawa-Gatineau region while operationally it performed the role of light infantry. The regiment pioneered what is now the changing of the Ceremonial Guard in Ottawa, with the first such ceremony to take place in the country being performed by the regiment on Canada Day in 1959 when the 1st Battalion mounted the new guard on Parliament Hill with its band and corps of drums. It also provided honor guards for the Opening of the Canadian parliament and sentries for guard duty at Rideau Hall. In September 1959, the regiment's 1st Battalion gave the royal salute following the proceedings of the swearing in of Georges Vanier as Governor General of Canada. It provided most of the guards of honour for state visits of heads of state, including Queen Elizabeth II, Emperor Haile Selassie of Ethiopia, and President John F. Kennedy. On 15 February 1965, the guards provided the guard of honour for an official ceremony held on the unveiling of the current Flag of Canada. Former Toronto Mayor Philip Givens inspects a guard of honour of the guards at the Toronto City Hall after the regiment returned from Cyprus in 1965. In 1969, these duties were transferred onto the Public Duties Detachment.

Bands
Throughout their existence the regular components of The Canadian Guards maintained a regimental band as well as pipes and drums. Known officially as the Band of Her Majesty's Canadian Guards, it was created on 22 April 1954 as a redesignation from the 1st Canadian Infantry Battalion Band and was disbanded on 30 September 1968. The band was based at Camp Borden from 1953 to 1957 and after which it was transferred to Petawawa where it stayed until the 70s. Bandsmen were recruited from other Canadian military bands as well as bands from the United Kingdom and the Netherlands. One of the major events the band took part in was the Canadian Armed Forces Tattoo 1967 for Canada's centennial celebrations that year.

In common with the pipes and drums of the Scots Guards in the British Army, pipers of The Canadian Guards were granted the privilege of wearing the British Royal Family's household tartan – the Royal Stuart tartan. The two pipe bands were part of the 2nd Battalion and the 4th Battalion. The latter was formed in November 1954, after the regimental headquarters obtained the authority to create a pipe band with British Army Pipe Major leading it. The band had few active pipers in the beginning but developed to where it performed the 2nd Battalion pipe band at the Canadian National Exhibition in 1956. The former on the other hand was formed in February 1954 under Pipe Major Archie Cairns and accompanied the battalion during its tour of duty in West Germany from 1957 to 1959. It returned to Canada in 1960 where it performed public duties on Parliament Hill as part the Old Guard during the changing of the guard. After his departure from the band in 1964, he was succeeded by William Stirling and later John Huggan, before eventually being transferred to the 3rd Battalion, The Royal Canadian Regiment In 1970.

Affiliations 
In the Canadian Forces, units may make formal, official links between each other called affiliations. These affiliations are "to foster continuous fraternal connections between military organizations beyond the close, professional relationships which are always encouraged." The two Reserve Force foot guard regiments, the Governor General's Foot Guards (GGFG) and the Canadian Grenadier Guards (CGG), were affiliated with the Canadian Guards, and from 1954 to 1976 they used Canadian Guards battalion numbers in token of the affiliation. Despite the battalion numbers, the GGFG and the CGG were considered separate regiments from the Canadian Guards. The affiliations automatically ceased when the Canadian Guards were put on the Supplementary Order of Battle in 1970.
 Governor General's Foot Guards (5th Battalion, The Canadian Guards)
 The Canadian Grenadier Guards (6th Battalion, The Canadian Guards)

Deployments
 Korea 1953–1954
 1st Battalion (3rd Battalion, The Royal Canadian Regiment) 1953-1954
 2nd Battalion (3rd Battalion Princess Patricia's Canadian Light Infantry)
 West Germany 1957–1962 – NATO assignment
 Cyprus 1964–1966 – UN mission

Notable members
 Colonel Strome Galloway, last Colonel of the Regiment
 James Gayfer, Director of Music of the Canadian Guards Band from 1954–1961.
 Lieutenant Colonel Ronald Cheriton, CO of the 2nd Battalion, Canadian Guards
 Charles Adams, Director of Music of the Canadian Guards Band from 1966–1968
Clifford Pierce, father of Toronto Sun sports editor Bill Pierce.
Ian Turnbull, principal percussionist with the Band of H.M. Canadian Guards and later on with the Band of the Royal Canadian Regiment.
RSM John James Thomas, Regimental Sergeant Major in the regiment beginning in September 1954.

Guards Association
The Canadian Guards Association was founded in October 1969 with Regimental Sergeant Major Jim Baird elected as its first president. It carried out the traditions of the regiment and included a group of 100 soldiers from all ranks. Its headquarters was located in Ottawa and was the parent organization for other branches established in Petawawa, Picton, and Oromocto. In 2018, with the 65th anniversary of the unit's founding approaching, it was announced that a final reunion would take place at Garrison Petawawa from 12 to 14 October. The decision was made due to the age range of members and the board of directors, averaging at around 80. At the reunion, the association signing a memorandum of understanding with the 3rd Battalion, The Royal Canadian Regiment that saw them act as custodians of the Guards collection. The Canadian Guards Memorial at the garrison was also rededicated during the ceremony.

See also
Household Brigade
Brigade of Guards
Ceremonial Guard
Musical Ride

References

William J. Patterson (1997). A regiment worthy of its hire : The Canadian Guards, 1953–1970. Ottawa: Canadian Guards Regimental Association, 1997.
Army Historical Section (1964). The Regiments and Corps of the Canadian Army. Ottawa: Queen's Printer, 1964.

External links
 The Canadian Guards Association
 1960s Ottawa Canada, 16mm Colour Home Movies
 Late 60s, Early 70s Ottawa, Ontario, 8mm Home Movies
 A Parliament Hill Presentation of Colours to The Canadian Guards in 1967

Military units and formations established in 1953
Former infantry regiments of Canada
Former guards regiments
Military units and formations disestablished in 1970
Canadian ceremonial units
Supplementary Order of Battle